Naomi Kathryn Rogge is an American ice hockey forward, currently playing for the University of Minnesota-Duluth in the NCAA.

Career 
During high school, she played for Eden Prairie High, winning an MSHL state title in 2016. She was named a finalist for the 2017 Minnesota Ms. Hockey Award. She also played lacrosse and association football in high school.

From 2017, she began attending the University of Minnesota-Duluth, playing for the university's women's ice hockey programme. She scored 24 points in 35 games in her rookie collegiate year, leading her team in scoring and ranking fifth in scoring among all WCHA rookies. Her production remained consistent in her second year, marking another 23 points in 35 games, despite starting off the season with a 6 games scoreless streak. She was named NCAA Player of the Week in mid-January 2019. She then missed the entire 2019–20 season after suffering a knee injury during the pre-season, the third UMD player in five years to miss an entire season with a knee injury. She returned for the 2020–21 season, scoring her first goal of the season in the opening game.

References

External links
 

1999 births
Living people
American women's ice hockey forwards
Ice hockey players from Minnesota
People from Eden Prairie, Minnesota
Minnesota Duluth Bulldogs women's ice hockey players